There are many journalism schools in South America, often forming faculties of universities. An evaluation of developments in journalism education in Latin America has been undertaken by Rosental Alves.

Brazil
 Communication School of State University of Ponta Grossa
 Communication School of State University of Mato Grosso
 Communication School of Federal University of Rio de Janeiro
 School of Journalism of the Pontifical Catholic University of São Paulo
 Journalism School of the Federal University of Santa Catarina
 School of Communication and the Arts of the University of São Paulo
 Faculdade Cásper Líbero of Social Communication
 School of Arts and Communication at São Paulo State University
 School of Communication at Anhembi Morumbi University
 Social Communication - Journalism at Federal University of Uberlândia
 School of Communication at Methodist University of São Paulo

Chile
 Instituto de Comunicación e Imagen, Universidad de Chile
 Facultad de Comunicaciones (Faculty of Communications), Pontificia Universidad Católica de Chile. This was the first Journalism School outside the US in being accredited by the ACEMJC.

Colombia
 University of Antioquia Journalism career. Rosario university Public Opinion Journalism

References

Journalism lists
Education in South America
Journalism schools